Saal an der Saale is a municipality  in the district of Rhön-Grabfeld in Bavaria in Germany. It is situated on the river Fränkische Saale. The municipality consists the two townships Saal an der Saale and Waltershausen.

 Ever since the 1978 "Gemeindegebietsreform" it has been the seat of the joint administration of these independent communities: Wülfershausen, Großeibstadt, and Saal an der Saale. The entire administrative area is home to roughly 4200 inhabitants as of 2008.

References

Rhön-Grabfeld